Tomboy is a 1985 American teen comedy film directed by Herb Freed and starring Betsy Russell.

Plot
The film concerns the life of Tomasina "Tommy" Boyd (Betsy Russell) who works as a mechanic and her hopes to become a stock car driver. When she falls for a visiting, more famous stock car racer,  who offends her with his chauvinistic remarks, a car race between the lovers has commenced.

Main cast
 Betsy Russell as Tomasina "Tommy" Boyd (Tomboy) 
 Gerard Christopher as Randy Starr (as Jerry DiNome)
 Kristi Somers as Seville Ritz 
 Richard Erdman as Chester 
 Philip Sterling as Earl Delarue 
 Eric Douglas as Ernie Leeds Jr.
 Paul Gunning as Frankie

Box office
The film was released on January 25, 1985 to 409 theaters and grossed $1,723,935 in the opening weekend (12.2%). Its final grossing in the US market was $14,100,000.

Home media
Tomboy received it first official DVD release in the United States on August 22, 2006. On September 29, 2009, Mill Creek Entertainment released Tomboy is a 'Too Cool for School Collection' which also featured Malibu Beach, Hunk, Cavegirl, The Van, The Pom Pom Girls, My Tutor, Jocks, Coach, The Beach Girls, Weekend Pass, and My Chauffeur. The film was also released alongside other feature film DVD collection. In 2011, it was released with Malibu Beach, My Chauffeur and Weekend Pass. It was made available in another 4-movie pack with My Tutor, My Chauffeur and Jocks.

References

External links
 
  
 
 

1985 films
1985 independent films
1985 romantic comedy films
1980s teen comedy films
1980s teen romance films
American independent films
American auto racing films
American romantic comedy films
American teen comedy films
American teen romance films
Crown International Pictures films
1980s English-language films
Films shot in Los Angeles
Films directed by Herb Freed
1980s American films